Dysphania botrys (syn. Chenopodium botrys), the Jerusalem oak goosefoot, sticky goosefoot or feathered geranium, is a flowering plant in the genus Dysphania (the glandular goosefoots). It is native to the Mediterranean region.

Jerusalem oak goosefoot was formerly classed in the genus Ambrosia, with the binomial name Ambrosia mexicana. It is naturalised in the United States and Mexico, the old species synonym deriving from the latter.

Cultivation
The plant has a strong scent, reminiscent of stock cubes, and can be used as a flavouring in cooking. It is cultivated as a hardy annual by gardeners.

References

External links

Jepson Manual Treatment - Chenopodium botrys
Chenopodium botrys - Photo gallery

botrys
Flora of Lebanon
Edible plants
Flora of New Jersey
Plants described in 1753
Taxa named by Carl Linnaeus
Flora without expected TNC conservation status